The Weera Wickrama Vibhushanaya (WWV, Decoration of Heroic Gallantry) (Sinhala: වීර වික්‍රම විභූෂණය vīra vickrama vibhūṣaṇaya) is the third-highest military decoration awarded by the Military of Sri Lanka for: 

The WWV is the highest wartime military decoration awarded by Sri Lanka that has not been awarded posthumously. Bars could be awarded for further acts of gallantry meriting the award for a second and third time, denoted by a star in the ribbon bar for each additional award.

Award process
The decoration is awarded by the President to all ranks of both the regular and volunteer forces following a formal recommendation by service commanders, and a full review process. Recipients are entitled to the use of the post-nominal letters "WWV".

Decorated personnel 
Major General Jagath Dias - SLVR
Major General Prasanna De Silva - SLLI
Major General Shavendra Silva - SLGR
Major General Sumeda Perera - SLGR
Major General Nandana Senadeera - SLGR
Major General Nirmal Dharmaratne - SF
 Air Vice Marshal Anselm Peries
 Rear Admiral Sirimevan Ranasinghe
 Rear Admiral Piyal De Silva
Brigadier Subashan Welikala - SLSR
 Air Vice Marshal Sagara Kotakadeniya
 Colonel Prasanna Wickramasuriya - SLGR
 Lieutenant Colonel J.A.L Jayasinghe  – Special Forces Regiment
 Commander Parakrama Samaraweera  - SLNS Ranaviru 
 Wing Commander Thilina Chandima Kaluarachchi  - No. 9 Attack Helicopter Squadron
 Wing Commander Asela Jayasekera
 Major Udaya Konarasinghe - SLLI
Major Niroshan Ratnayake - SLSR
 Squadron Leader Poojana Gunathilake 
Squadron Leader Sanoj Jayarathne
 Squadron Leader Amal Wahid 
 Lieutenant Commander S. W. Gallage
 Captain Saliya Upul Aladeniya  – SLSR
 Vice Admiral Travis Sinniah
 Corporal Wickramapala - Sri Lanka Sinha Regiment
 Colonel Channa Seneviratne - SLA
Wing Commander Dayal Wijeratne - No 6 Helicopter Squadron Sri Lanka Air Force
 Wing Commander Chandika Kanishka Siriwardene - SLAF
 Captain Kodituwakku - Special Forces Regiment
 Staff Sergeant Chaminda Wijesooriya - Sri Lanka Army Special Forces Regiment

References

External links
Ministry of Defence, Sri Lanka
Sri Lanka Army
Sri Lanka Navy
Sri Lanka Air Force

Military awards and decorations of Sri Lanka
Awards established in 1981